For data storage, identification is the capability to find, retrieve, report, change, or delete specific data without ambiguity. This applies especially to information stored in databases. In database normalisation, the process of organizing the fields and tables of a relational database to minimize redundancy and dependency, is the central, defining function of the discipline.

See also 
 Authentication
 Identification (disambiguation)
 Forensic profiling
 Profiling (information science)
 Unique identifier

References 

 
Data modeling